The Oslo Metro is a metro system that serves Oslo and Bærum in Norway. There are in total 73 stations in service, 17 temporarily inoperational and 16 that are disused. All of the 16 disused stations that were closed between 1935 and 2006 are located in the West End of Oslo. The first station to be closed was Engerjordet, which was taken out of use in 1935 because it had too few passengers to make its retention feasible. In the 1990s, several stations on the Røa and Sognsvann Lines were closed, following the upgrade of the lines from light rail to rapid transit standard.

Stations

The following table lists the name of each station, the line the station is located on, the opening and closure date, and the distance from Stortinget. It also lists the grade, which informs whether the station is underground, built-in or above ground (at-grade). Note that some of the stations have been rebuilt under the same name in different locations.

See also 
 List of disused Oslo Tramway stations

Notes

References

Bibliography